A Elavarasan (born 7 June 1952, in Kuvagam, Ariyalur district, Tamil Nadu) is an Indian politician from  the State of Tamil Nadu who belongs to the AIADMK party.

He represented Tamil Nadu in Rajya Sabha for the term 2007–2013.

References

Living people
1952 births
Rajya Sabha members from Tamil Nadu
People from Ariyalur district